The Ally Challenge is a PGA Tour Champions event at Warwick Hills Golf and Country Club in Grand Blanc Township, Michigan, just south of Flint, which debuted in September 2018. The tournament is sponsored by Grand Blanc-based McLaren Health Care. Detroit-based Ally Financial is the title sponsor. Beyond the tournament, the Ally Challenge event includes a pro-am on Wednesday and Thursday, The Ally Challenge Community Concert on Friday and Adidas 5K Challenge run/walk event on Saturday morning.

Net proceeds from the tournament were earmarked for Community Foundation of Greater Flint and Junior Achievement of Southeastern Michigan plus additional charities could participate in the Birdies for Charities fundraising program. Grand Blanc Community Schools benefits by using their parking lots to generate revenue.

Background
Previously, the area had the Buick Open from 1958 through 2009 at the Warwick Hills Golf Club, as one of six former PGA Tour sites hosting PGA Tour Champions events. Since that tournament left, the golf club had been looking to get a replace in a PGA Tour Champions event. The main issue was finding a title sponsor.

History
The Ally Challenge was announced by the PGA on August 26, 2017 as a PGA Tour Champions tournament playing September 10–16, 2018. An agreement is in place for the $2 million purse tournament until 2020. The Challenge would also included a pro-am on Wednesday and Thursday. 

On November 10, 2017, the tournament announced McLaren Health Care as presenting sponsor. Plus, they indicated tickets were on sale, a Big & Rich concert would be held after the first round and a 5K run would also be held. The Birdies for Charities fundraising program was announced in May 2018 for additional 501(c)3 charity to join. The 5K run/walk was announced on June 22, 2018 to be sponsor by Adidas as the Adidas 5K Challenge held before the second round with benefiting non-profits as the Community Foundation of Greater Flint and Junior Achievement of Southeastern Michigan.

The Genesee County Board of Commissioners embroiled the tournament in a controversy over their April 2, 2018 approval, 7–1, of using veterans millage funds towards sponsoring the event as "outreach". With the sponsorship, the county would get free access for veterans to the tournament and a "Patriot Pavilion" at the 18th fairway for all active and reserve military, veterans and their dependents. On April 9, 2018, after a commissioner sponsored petition with 500 signatures and an hour of mostly veterans speaking against the sponsorship, the board reversed it vote, initially 6–2–1 before voting switching made it unanimous. 

Paul Broadhurst was the inaugural 2018 tournament winner with a 15-under-par 201 score to beat Brandt Jobe by two strokes. All three rounds of the tournament was broadcast on the Golf Channel.

On August 2, 2020, major champion Jim Furyk won the tournament in his PGA Tour Champions debut, becoming the first golfer to have won the former Buick Open held here to win The Ally Challenge.

Winners

References

External links

Coverage on the PGA Tour Champions official site

PGA Tour Champions events
Golf in Michigan
Recurring sporting events established in 2018